Parnassius baileyi, or Bailey's Apollo, is a high-altitude butterfly which is found in southwestern China (Sichuan, northern Yunnan and eastern Tibet). It is a member of the snow Apollo genus (Parnassius) of the swallowtail family (Papilionidae).

The taxonomic status of this butterfly is uncertain. P. baileyi was originally described as a subspecies of P. acco, later as a subspecies of P. rothschildianus Bryk, 1931 and also P. przewalskii (Alphérakyi 1887), and now also treated as a separate species (Weiss 1992), (Chou, 1994). Molecular studies suggest it is the sister species of P. acco.

The butterfly was named for Frederick Marshman Bailey who collected the first specimens.

Subspecies
Parnassius baileyi baileyi
Parnassius baileyi bubo Bryk, 1938
Parnassius baileyi rothschildianus Bryk, 1931

References
Chou, I. (ed) 1994. Monographia Rhopalocerorum Sinensium (Monograph of Chinese Butterflies) [in Chinese]. Henan Scientific and Technological Publishing House, Zhengzhou.
Weiss, J.-C. 1992. The Parnassiinae of the World. Part 2. Sciences Nat, Venette; 87 pp.
Chen, Yong-Jiu et al. 1999 The Phylogeny of 5 Chinese Peculiar Parnassius Butterflies Using Noninvasive Sampling mtDNA Sequences Journal of Genetics and Genomics 26(3): 203-207

External links
NRM Holotype of baileyi in the Swedish museum of Natural History where it is regarded as a subspecies of Parnassius acco
"Tadumia baileyi South". Insecta.pro.

baileyi
Butterflies described in 1913